The Open University of Sudan (OUS) is a public university based in Khartoum, Sudan that provides bachelor and postgraduate courses through distance education.
The university is a member of the Federation of the Universities of the Islamic World.

OUS at Galance

Motto

Education for All

Mission

To be a leading and distinct institution in the open, distance education locally and globally.

OUS Vision:

Ensuring national identity and affirmation of the cultural heritage through the curricula and academic programs.

Inculcating new educational and behavioral norms, which promote the values of self-reliance and continuous self-education as well as the cultivation of talents and enhancement of mental, physical, aesthetic and creative faculties and the refinement of spiritual and moral values.

Realization of democratization of education by providing equal educational opportunities for all without any form of discrimination through the expansion of higher education and training for the benefit of those who missed out education and the provision of opportunity to pursue education in combination with employment.

Dissemination of continuous education and community education.

Provision of qualified and trained manpower, sufficiently competent to meet the requirements of national development.

Contribution in the development and improvement of quality education through the use of modern multi-media technology.

Strengthening educational and cultural cooperation with local, regional, and international institutions.

Contribution to enlightenment and cultural initiatives.

OUS Objectives:

To expand higher education opportunities in response to the increasing social demand through the diversification of academic programs and provision of easy access to them.

To offer alternative opportunities for those who missed higher education due to social, cultural, economic or geographical barriers.

To offer in-service training and continuous education for different groups in the labor market to meet the needs of vocational development to improve proficiency, performance, and production.

To offer education to learners and students at their residences.

To extend the participation of the different sectors of the community in local development.

To strengthen of cooperation between the traditional campus university education and the ODL to facilitate the movement of learners across the different educational institutions.

To create suitable environment for graduate studies and scientific research relating to the needs of the various communities.

To adapt and appropriately use modern technology to insure  effective delivery of academic programs.

To strengthen links with public and private educational institutions to help in addressing their needs in planning courses and curricula and to offer academic and technical advice as needed.

To create cultural orientation of disciplines and affirmation of the primacy of Arabic and English and inculcate the importance of other languages and translation.

To involve the documentation of cultural, spiritual and environmental heritage.

The Departments
Center for Human Resources Management
MBA Of finance
 Department of Public Relations
 Educational Broadcasting
 Educational satellite channel
 Secretariat of the Libraries
 Center for Human Resources Management
 Education Development Center
 Center for Arabic Language for Speakers of Other Languages
 Continuing Education Project
 Technical Education Project
 E-learning project

References 

Universities and colleges in Sudan
Education in Khartoum
Educational institutions established in 2002
Distance education institutions based in Sudan
2002 establishments in Sudan